Piletocera ulophanes is a moth in the family Crambidae. It was described by Edward Meyrick in 1886. It is found in Fiji.

References

U
Endemic fauna of Fiji
Moths of Fiji
Moths described in 1886